"Next Love" is a song recorded by American singer and songwriter Deniece Williams. It was released in 1984 for Columbia Records. The song was written and produced by the singer herself and the multi-instrumentalist George Duke.

The song comes from her 1984 album Let's Hear it for the Boy which also features the crossover hit of the same name.

"Next Love" peaked  at number 17 on the Billboard Dance and number 22 on the R&B chart. It also entered the Hot 100 chart, peaking low at number 81.

Track listing

1984 release  
12" vinyl
 US: Columbia / 44 05043

Personnel 
 Fred Washington –  bass guitar
Hubert Laws – flute 
Paul Jackson – guitar
Sheila E. – percussion
Ricky Lawson – drums
George Merrill, Roosevelt Christmas, Shannon Rubicam – background vocals
George Duke – composer, Rhodes electric piano, Memory Moog synthesizer

Chart performance

References 

1984 singles
Deniece Williams songs
1984 songs
Songs written by Deniece Williams
Columbia Records singles